The Verdict is a 2013 Belgian crime film directed by Jan Verheyen that premiered at the Montreal World Film Festival.

Cast 
 Koen De Bouw as Luc Segers
 Johan Leysen as Jan de Cock, Segers’ lawyer
 Veerle Baetens as Teugels, De Groot's lawyer
 Jappe Claes as Procureur-Generaal Vanderbiest
 Joke Devynck as Ella De Graeve
 Hendrik Aerts as Kenny De Groot
 Jo De Caluwé as Rechter

External links 
 

2013 films
2013 crime drama films
Belgian crime drama films
2010s Dutch-language films
Films shot in Antwerp
Films shot in Bruges
Films shot in Brussels
Films shot in Ghent
Dutch-language Belgian films